Owen Lacey Friend (March 21, 1927 – October 14, 2007) was a Major League Baseball second baseman for five different teams between 1949 and 1956. Listed at 6'1, 180 lb., Friend batted and threw right-handed. Nicknamed "Red", he was born in Granite City, Illinois.
 
Strictly a line drive hitter, Friend entered the majors with the St. Louis Browns, playing for them two years (1949–50) before joining the Detroit Tigers (1953), Cleveland Indians (1953), Boston Red Sox (1955) and Chicago Cubs (1955–56). His most productive season came for the 1950 Browns, when he posted career-numbers in games played (119), home runs (8), RBI (50) and runs (48), while hitting a .237 batting average. In a five-season career, Friend was a .227 hitter (136–for–598) with 13 home runs and 76 RBI in 208 games, including 24 doubles, two triples, and two stolen bases. As an infielder, he made 194 appearances at second base (141), third base (27) and shortstop (26).

Following his playing retirement, Friend managed in the minors during 11 seasons (1960–65, 1967, 1970–71, 1974–75), served as a scout for the Houston Astros (1966) and Baltimore Orioles (1967–68), and also joined the original coaching staff of the 1969 Kansas City Royals. Friend wore uniform number 5 for the Royals, a number George Brett would later wear and retire. Friend died in Wichita, Kansas at age 80.

Sources
Owen Friend - Baseballbiography.com
Baseball Reference
Retrosheet
The Deadball Era

1927 births
2007 deaths
Baltimore Orioles scouts
Baseball players from Illinois
Billings Mustangs managers
Boston Red Sox players
Chicago Cubs players
Cleveland Indians players
Dallas Rangers players
Detroit Tigers players
Elmira Pioneers players
Havana Sugar Kings players
Houston Astros scouts
Indianapolis Indians players
Kansas City Royals coaches
Kansas City Royals scouts
Louisville Colonels (minor league) players
Major League Baseball second basemen
Memphis Chickasaws players
Muskegon Clippers players
Newark Moundsmen players
People from Granite City, Illinois
Phoenix Giants players
Raleigh Capitals players
Rocky Mount Senators players
St. Louis Browns players
San Antonio Missions players
Springfield Browns players
Wenatchee Chiefs players
American expatriate baseball players in Cuba